ROKS Busan (FF-959) is the eighth ship of the Ulsan-class frigate in the Republic of Korea Navy. She is named after the city, Busan.

Development 

In the early 1990s, the Korean government plan for the construction of next generation coastal ships named Frigate 2000 was scrapped due to the 1997 Asian financial crisis. But the decommissioning of the  destroyers and the aging fleet of Ulsan-class frigates, the plan was revived as the Future Frigate eXperimental, also known as FFX in the early 2000s. 

10 ships were launched and commissioned from 1980 to 1993. They have 3 different variants which consists of Flight I, Flight II and Flight III.

Construction and career 
ROKS Busan was launched on 20 February 1992 by Hyundai Heavy Industries and commissioned on 1 January 1993.

On 31 May 2014, USS Wayne E. Meyer, ROKS Busan and Prairial underwent together in a joint exercise off Busan.

References

External links

1992 ships
Ulsan-class frigates
Frigates of the Republic of Korea Navy
Ships built by Hyundai Heavy Industries Group